Vardi Nature Reserve is a nature reserve in Rapla County in central Estonia.

Vardi nature reserve encompasses one of the few remaining alvar forests in Estonia, an unusual landscape type today as cut-down forests normally never recover.

References

Nature reserves in Estonia
Märjamaa Parish
Geography of Rapla County